Steve Kinder (born c. 1963) is head basketball coach of the Humboldt State University Lumberjacks. 

Kinder earned a B.S. in physical education from HSU in 1985 when he also played for the basketball team that won the California Collegiate Athletic Association that year.  He received an M.A. from Humboldt in 1988.

He was an assistant basketball coach at Oceanside High School from 1989 to 1990.  He returned to Humboldt where he served as an assistant to basketball coach Tom Wood from 1990 to 2010.

In his first year as head coach in the 2010-11 season the Lumberjacks went 26-4, won the CCAA title and appeared in the NCAA playoffs.  He received the first Clarence Gaines Award for the nation's best Division II basketball coach in 2011.

In the 2011-12 season the team was 22-8, won the CCAA post season tournament and lost in the first round of the NCAA playoffs.

References

1960s births
Living people
College men's basketball head coaches in the United States
Humboldt State Lumberjacks men's basketball coaches
Cal Poly Humboldt Lumberjacks men's basketball players